Malik is a Semitic word meaning "king" or "chieftain", and a Greenlandic meaning "wave".

Malik or Maalik may also refer to:

People 
 Malik (name)
 Malik (surname)

Communities and tribes 
Muslim rulers often bestowed the title of Malik on loyal tribal leaders and chieftains in South Asia:
 Malik (Gujarat), a Gujarati Muslim community
 Malik (Jat), a Jat clan found in the Indian state of Haryana
 Malik caste, a Punjabi Muslim tribe
 Malik (Kashmir), a Kashmiri kram or tribe

Places
 Malik, Cambodia, commune, north east Cambodia
 Malik, Croatia, a village near Bosiljevo, Croatia
 Malik, Iran, a village in Kerman Province, Iran

Arts, entertainment, and media

Fictional characters
 Marik Ishtar, known as "Malik Ishtar" in Japanese (マリク・イシュタール), a character from Yu-Gi-Oh! Duel Monsters
 Malik Al-Sayf, a character from the video game series Assassin's Creed
 Malik Begum, a character from the British web series Corner Shop Show
 Malik Caesar, a character in the 2009 video game Tales of Graces
 Faridah Malik, a character from the 2011 video game Deus Ex: Human Revolution
 Malik Wright, a character from the American comedy-drama television series The Game

Films
 Maalik (1972 film), an Indian Hindi drama film
 Maalik (2016 film), a Pakistani political-thriller film
 Malik (film), an Indian Malayalam political action film

Music
 Malik, a 1975 album by the French funk-rock band Lafayette Afro Rock Band

Other uses
 Maalik, in Islam, the Hell / Purgatory guardian
 Storm Malik, a 2022 European windstorm

See also
 
 Malach (disambiguation)
 Malak (disambiguation)
 Malakh, a Somali title meaning war leader
 Malek (disambiguation)
 Malick (disambiguation)
 Malika (disambiguation)
 Mallik Island, in the Canadian Arctic
 Melek (disambiguation)
 Melik, a hereditary Armenian noble title